1913 in Argentine football saw Racing Club de Avellaneda win its first league championship. The team also won the Copa Ibarguren, the Copa de Honor Municipalidad de Buenos Aires and the Copa de Honor Cousenier.

Estudiantes de La Plata won its first championship, taking the dissident FAF league title. Rosario Central won the Copa de Competencia La Nación.

The Argentina national team won three championships against Uruguay and carried out a brief tour of Chile.

Primera División

Asociación Argentina de Football  - Copa Campeonato
The number of teams was considerably increased (from 6 to 15), adding Platense, Estudiantil Porteño, Ferrocarril Sud, Olivos, Riachuelo, Banfield, Comercio, Ferro Carril Oeste and Boca Juniors. Olivos and Riachuelo were relegated at the end of the season.

Final playoff

Federación Argentina de Football

Lower divisions

Intermedia
AFA Champion: Huracán
FAF Champion: Floresta

Segunda División
AFA Champion: Ferro Carril Oeste III
FAF Champion: Estudiantes (LP) III

Tercera División
AFA Champion: Libertarios Unidos
FAF Champion: Solís

Domestic cups

Copa de Honor Municipalidad de Buenos Aires
Champion: Racing Club

Final

Copa de Competencia Jockey Club
Champion: San Isidro

Final

Copa de Competencia La Nación
Champion: Rosario Central

Final

Copa Ibarguren
Champion: Racing Club

Final

International cups

Tie Cup
Champion:  Nacional

Final

Copa de Honor Cousenier
Champion:  Racing Club

Finals

Argentina national team
Argentina won all the trophies contested that year, the Presidente Roque Sáenz Peña, Lipton and Premier Honor Argentino Cups.

Copa Presidente Roque Sáenz Peña

Copa Lipton

Copa Premier Honor Argentino

Friendly matches

References

 
Seasons in Argentine football